Brush Sports F.C., previously known as Loughborough Brush F.C. was an English association football club which participated in the Leicestershire Senior League and the FA Cup.

Former players 
1. Players that have played/managed in the Football League (or any foreign equivalent to this level i.e. fully professional leagues):

 Ken Oliver: Started his career at Brush Sports before playing for Sunderland, Derby County and Exeter City
 Bill Farmer: Joined Brush Sports in 1951 after 6 seasons at Nottingham Forest, before signing for Oldham Athletic in 1957 

2. Players with full international caps:

3. Players that hold a club record or have captained the club:
  Reginald Boyne

References

Defunct football clubs in England
Sport in Leicestershire
Defunct football clubs in Leicestershire
Works association football teams in England